Rat Burana is one of the 50 districts (khet) of Bangkok, Thailand. The district is bounded by (clockwise from east to north) Phra Pradaeng of Samut Prakan province, Thung Khru, Chom Thong and Thon Buri districts of Bangkok while its north to east is Chao Phraya River with (clockwise) Bang Kho Laem and Yan Nawa districts across the river.

History
The area was settled as a frontier for Thonburi when King Taksin established Thonburi as the new capital. Later administration reform placed Rat Burana as an amphoe of Thonburi province. It was then moved to Nakhon Khuan Khan province (now Amphoe Phra Pradaeng) until the province was demoted to an amphoe of Samut Prakan province. It was then moved back to Thonburi province until Thonburi and Bangkok were merged. It is now a district of Bangkok. In 1998, part of Rat Burana left to form a new district, Thung Khru.

The area of Rat Burana district in the past was orchards adjacent to the Chao Phraya River, Rat Burana people have a career as a farmer in areca palm cultivation and the thing that is famous here is Chompoo mamiao (ชมพู่มะเหมี่ยว; a variety of rose apple), which has a sweet crispy flavor. 

Rat Burana district is home to many important ancient temples such as Wat Prasert Sutthawat, Wat Bang Pakok, Wat Chaeng Ron,  Wat Son, Wat Rat Burana, with also the location of the "Rama IX Bridge" important transportation routes as well. 

In 2015, Baan Khru Noi, "One of Bangkok's oldest" charity homes for children, was scheduled to close after 30 years.

Administration
The district is sub-divided into two sub-districts (khwaeng).

References

External links
Rat Burana district office

 
Districts of Bangkok